In mathematics, constructible set may refer to either:
 a notion in Gödel's constructible universe.
 a union of locally closed set in a topological space. See constructible set (topology).